The 4th Air Division is an inactive United States Air Force unit. Its last assignment was with Fifteenth Air Force, stationed at Francis E. Warren Air Force Base, Wyoming. It was inactivated on 23 August 1988.

As the 4th Bombardment Wing, the unit was one of the primary B-17 Flying Fortress heavy strategic bombardment wings of VIII Bomber Command (later Eighth Air Force in World War II.

During the Cold War, the 4th Air Division' was an intermediate command echelon of Strategic Air Command, controlling strategic bombardment and intercontinental strategic missile wings until inactivated in 1988.

History
The 4th Bombardment Wing moved to England in June 1943 and as a part of Eighth Air Force began bombing operations against German occupied Europe. Targets included shipyards, synthetic rubber plants, chemical plants, marshalling yards, and oil facilities. In July the wing grew to seven combat groups, which resulted in a reorganization of its groups on 13 September 1943 into the 3d Bombardment Division as a new higher echelon over the 4th and two wings which had groups assigned for the first time: the 13th and 45th Combat Bomb Wings. The 4th CBW administratively controlled only two groups until December 1943, when the newly arrived 447th BG was assigned to it.

In 1944, some subordinate units attacked coastline defenses and marshalling yards in preparation for the Allied invasion of France. Some units supported ground troops during the Battle of the Bulge (December 1944 – January 1945) and the assault across the Rhine (March 1945 – April 1945).

In the postwar years, the command was part of Air Defense Command assigned as a reserve wing assigned to First Air Force from 1946 to 1949.

Rectivated in 1951 as an intermediate command echelon of Strategic Air Command, the 4th Air Division was part of Second Air Force, controlling B-29, Boeing B-50 Superfortress and B-47 wings. In 1962, units controlled by the 4th Air Division supported 2d Air Force's post attack command and control system, and became responsible for the Advanced Airborne Command Post. It participated in the 1962 Cuban Missile Crisis and trained in electronic countermeasures and conducted combat operations in Southeast Asia in the late 1960s.

Reassigned to SAC's Fifteenth Air Force in 1970, the 4th assured that assigned units were capable of conducting strategic aerospace warfare using intercontinental ballistic missiles, long-range bombardment, and air refueling resources, according to the Emergency War Order. In addition, the division assumed airborne command and control responsibilities that consisted of supporting auxiliary airborne command post aircraft.

Inactivated in 1988 as a result of budget reductions and a consolidation of SAC's command and control echelons.

Lineage
 Established as the 4th Bombardment Wing on 19 October 1940
 Activated on 18 December 1940
 Inactivated on 1 October 1941
 Activated on 7 June 1942
 Redesignated 4th Combat Bombardment Wing (Heavy) on 30 August 1943
 Redesignated 4th Combat Bombardment Wing, Heavy on 24 August 1944
 Disestablished on 18 June 1945
 Reestablished and redesignated 4th Bombardment Wing, Light on 31 December 1946
 Activated in the Reserve on 20 December 1946
 Redesignated 4th Air Division, Bombardment on 16 April 1948
 Inactivated on 27 June 1949
 Redesignated 4th Air Division on 1 February 1951
 Organized on 10 February 1951
 Discontinued on 16 June 1952
 Activated on 16 June 1952
 Redesignated 4th Strategic Aerospace Division on 1 September 1964
 Redesignated 4th Strategic Missile Division on 30 June 1971
 Redesignated 4th Air Division on 1 March 1973
 Inactivated on 23 August 1988

Assignments
 General Headquarters Air Force, 18 December 1940 – 1 October 1941
 Apparently further assigned to Northeast Air District (later, First Air Force) c. 16 January 1941
 VIII Bomber Command, 7 June 1942
 3d Bombardment Division, 13 September 1943 – 18 June 1945
 First Air Force, 20 December 1946 – 27 June 1949
 Second Air Force, 16 June 1952
 Fifteenth Air Force, 31 March 1970 – 23 August 1988

Components

Wings
 2d Bombardment Wing: 1 April 1963 – 1 September 1964
 28th Bombardment Wing: 15 January 1973 – 1 May 1982
 44th Strategic Missile Wing: 30 June 1971 – 1 May 1982; 23 January 1987 – 15 July 1988
 55th Strategic Reconnaissance Wing: 1 October 1976 – 1 April 1980
 90th Strategic Missile Wing: 30 June 1971 – 23 August 1988
 91st Strategic Reconnaissance Wing (later 91st Strategic Missile Wing): 10 February – 11 September 1951; 30 June 1971 – 30 November 1972
 92d Strategic Aerospace Wing: 31 March 1970 – 30 June 1971
 97th Bombardment Wing: 1 July 1959 – 1 July 1963
 301st Bombardment Wing (later 301st Air Refueling Wing): 10 February 1951 – 15 April 1958 (detached 3 December 1951 – c. 4 March 1953; c. 10 February-c. 17 April 1954); 5 January – 23 August 1988
 319th Bombardment Wing: 1 September 1964 – 30 June 1971; 15 January 1973 – 22 January 1975; 1 May 1982 – 23 January 1987
 321st Strategic Missile Wing: 1 November 1964 – 22 January 1975; 1 May 1982 – 23 January 1987
 340th Bombardment Wing: 1 September 1963 – 1 September 1964 (detached c. 1–31 August 1964). 321 Strategic Missile: 1 November 1964 – 22 January 1975; 1 May 1982 – 23 January 1987
 341st Strategic Missile Wing: 30 June 1971 – 15 January 1973; 23 January 1987 – 23 August 1988
 351st Strategic Missile Wing: 30 June 1971 – 1 July 1973
 376th Bombardment Wing: 1 June 1951 – 3 December 1957 (detached 1 June – 10 October 1951)
 401st Provisional Combat Bommbardment Wing: 6 June – 14 September 1943
 410th Bombardment Wing: 1 September 1964 – 31 March 1970
 454th Bombardment Wing: 1 February – 1 July 1963
 494th Bombardment Wing: 1 July 1963 – 1 July 1964
 4130th Strategic Wing: 1 July-l September 1963
 4228th Strategic Wing: 1 July 1958 – 1 February 1963
 4238th Strategic Wing: 1 March 1958 – 1 April 1963

Groups
 34th Bombardment Group: 18 August-c. 1 October 1941
 43d Bombardment Group: August-5 September 1941
 94th Bombardment Group: 13 June 1943 – 6 January 1945
 95th Bombardment Group: July-13 September 1943
 96th Bombardment Group: c. May-c. September 1943
 100th Bombardment Group: 6 June 1943 – 1 January 1944
 319th Bombardment Group: 17 October 1947 – 27 June 1949
 320th Bombardment Group: 17 October 1947 – 27 June 1949
 385th Bombardment Group: c. June 1943-c. August 1945
 388th Bombardment Group: c. July 1943-c. August 1945
 390th Bombardment Group: c. July-13 September 1943
 447th Bombardment Group: c. November 1943-c. June 1945
 486th Bombardment Group: c. January-c. June 1945
 487th Bombardment Group: c. January-c. August 1945

Squadron
 376th Air Refueling Squadron: 1 June 1951 – 20 May 1952; 1 December 1957 – 15 April 1958

Stations

 Mitchel Field, New York, 18 December 1940
 Westover Field, Massachusetts, 20 March – 1 October 1941; 7 June 1942
 Bolling Field, District of Columbia, c. 28 July c. 28 August 1942
 RAF High Wycombe (Camp Lynn) (AAF-101), England, 12 September 1942
 Marks Hall (AAF-160), England, 18 January 1943
 Camp Blainey, England, June 1943

 RAF Bury St Edmunds (AAF-468), England, 13 September 1943 – 18 June 1945
 Mitchel Field, New York, 20 December 1946 – 27 June 1949
 Barksdale Air Force Base, Louisiana, 10 February 1951 16 June 1952; 16 June 1952 – 1 September 1964
 Grand Forks Air Force Base, North Dakota, 1 September 1964
 Francis E. Warren Air Force Base, Wyoming, 30 June 1971 – 23 August 1988

Aircraft and missiles

 A-29 Hudson 1941
 B-17 Flying Fortress 1941
 B-18 Bolo 1941
 LB-30 1941
 B-17 Flying Fortress 1943–1945
 B/RB-45 Tornado 1951
 RB-50 Superfortress 1951
 B-29 Superfortress 1951 – 1952, 1952–1954
 KB-29 Superfortress 1951 – 1952, 1952–1953
 B-47 Stratojet 1953 – 1958
 KC-97 Stratofreighter 1953 – 1958

 B/E/EB-47 Stratojet 1954 – 1957
 RB-47 Stratojet 1958
 B-52 Stratofortress 1959 – 1988
 KC-135 Stratotanker 1959 – 1988
 LGM-30A Minuteman I 1963 – 1974
 LGM-30F Minuteman II 1965 – 1988
 LGM 30G Minuteman III 1971 – 1972 1973 – 1988
 C-135 Stratolifter 1977 – 1980
 E-4 Nightwatch 1977 – 1980
 EC-135 Looking Glass 1977 – 1982
 RC-135 Rivet Joint 1977 – 1980
 LGM-118A Peacekeeper 1986 – 1988

See also
 List of United States Air Force air divisions

References

Notes

Bibliography

 
 

004
Division 0004
1940 establishments in New York (state)
1988 disestablishments in Wyoming